Willerby may refer to several places:

Willerby, East Riding of Yorkshire,  a village and civil parish located on the western outskirts of the city of Kingston upon Hull in the East Riding of Yorkshire
Willerby, North Yorkshire,  a small village and civil parish in the Ryedale district of North Yorkshire

It may also refer to:
, one of two merchant vessels